Talitsa is the name of several inhabited localities in Russia.

Modern localities

Altai Krai
As of 2012, two rural localities in Altai Krai bear this name:
Talitsa, Sovetsky District, Altai Krai, a selo in Talitsky Selsoviet of Sovetsky District; 
Talitsa, Zalesovsky District, Altai Krai, a selo in Bolshekaltaysky Selsoviet of Zalesovsky District;

Altai Republic
As of 2012, one rural locality in the Altai Republic bears this name:
Talitsa, Altai Republic, a selo in Talitskoye Rural Settlement of Ust-Kansky District

Ivanovo Oblast
As of 2012, one rural locality in Ivanovo Oblast bears this name:
Talitsa, Ivanovo Oblast, a selo in Yuryevetsky District

Kirov Oblast
As of 2012, two rural localities in Kirov Oblast bear this name:
Talitsa, Falyonsky District, Kirov Oblast, a selo in Talitsky Rural Okrug of Falyonsky District; 
Talitsa, Zuyevsky District, Kirov Oblast, a settlement in Chepetsky Rural Okrug of Zuyevsky District;

Komi Republic
As of 2012, one rural locality in the Komi Republic bears this name:
Talitsa, Komi Republic, a village in Guryevka Selo Administrative Territory of Priluzsky District;

Kostroma Oblast
As of 2012, three rural localities in Kostroma Oblast bear this name:
Talitsa, Baranovskoye Settlement, Buysky District, Kostroma Oblast, a village in Baranovskoye Settlement of Buysky District; 
Talitsa, Tsentralnoye Settlement, Buysky District, Kostroma Oblast, a settlement in Tsentralnoye Settlement of Buysky District; 
Talitsa, Vokhomsky District, Kostroma Oblast, a settlement in Tikhonovskoye Settlement of Vokhomsky District;

Lipetsk Oblast
As of 2012, two rural localities in Lipetsk Oblast bear this name:
Talitsa, Krasninsky District, Lipetsk Oblast, a village in Krasninsky Selsoviet of Krasninsky District; 
Talitsa, Yeletsky District, Lipetsk Oblast, a selo in Kolosovsky Selsoviet of Yeletsky District;

Nizhny Novgorod Oblast
As of 2012, one rural locality in Nizhny Novgorod Oblast bears this name:
Talitsa, Nizhny Novgorod Oblast, a village in Gorevsky Selsoviet of Koverninsky District

Perm Krai
As of 2012, two rural localities in Perm Krai bear this name:
Talitsa, Dobryanka, Perm Krai, a settlement under the administrative jurisdiction of the town of krai significance of Dobryanka
Talitsa, Nytvensky District, Perm Krai, a village in Nytvensky District

Sverdlovsk Oblast
As of 2012, four inhabited localities in Sverdlovsk Oblast bear this name:

Urban localities
Talitsa, Talitsky District, Sverdlovsk Oblast, a town in Talitsky District

Rural localities
Talitsa, Nizhneserginsky District, Sverdlovsk Oblast, a village in Nizhneserginsky District
Talitsa, Pyshminsky District, Sverdlovsk Oblast, a village in Pyshminsky District
Talitsa, Sukholozhsky District, Sverdlovsk Oblast, a selo in Sukholozhsky District

Tver Oblast
As of 2012, two rural localities in Tver Oblast bear this name:
Talitsa, Oleninsky District, Tver Oblast, a village in Grishinskoye Rural Settlement of Oleninsky District
Talitsa, Toropetsky District, Tver Oblast, a village in Ponizovskoye Rural Settlement of Toropetsky District

Vologda Oblast
As of 2012, four rural localities in Vologda Oblast bear this name:
Talitsa, Babushkinsky District, Vologda Oblast, a village in Velikodvorsky Selsoviet of Babushkinsky District
Talitsa, Minkinsky Selsoviet, Gryazovetsky District, Vologda Oblast, a village in Minkinsky Selsoviet of Gryazovetsky District
Talitsa, Rostilovsky Selsoviet, Gryazovetsky District, Vologda Oblast, a village in Rostilovsky Selsoviet of Gryazovetsky District
Talitsa, Nikolsky District, Vologda Oblast, a village in Lobovsky Selsoviet of Nikolsky District

Yaroslavl Oblast
As of 2012, one rural locality in Yaroslavl Oblast bears this name:
Talitsa, Yaroslavl Oblast, a village in Shopshinsky Rural Okrug of Gavrilov-Yamsky District

Abolished localities
Talitsa, Mezhevskoy District, Kostroma Oblast, a village in Georgiyevsky Selsoviet of Mezhevskoy District of Kostroma Oblast; abolished on October 6, 2004

Alternative names
Talitsa, alternative name of Rybopitomnik, a settlement in Ilyinsky Rural Okrug of Slobodskoy District in Kirov Oblast; 
Talitsa, alternative name of Bolshaya Talitsa, a village in Shangskoye Settlement of Sharyinsky District in Kostroma Oblast;

References

Notes

Sources